Ellsworth Burnett (August 5, 1836 – April 14, 1895) was an American politician who served as a member of the Wisconsin State Assembly.

Early life
Burnett was born in Madrid, New York, though reports have differed on the exact date. He later moved to River Falls, Wisconsin.

Career 
After moving to Wisconsin, Burnett became involved in the lumber and farming industries. During the American Civil War, Burnett originally enlisted with the 30th Wisconsin Infantry Regiment of the Union Army, where he became a sergeant. Later, he joined the 37th Wisconsin Infantry Regiment and was attached to the Army of the Potomac. He achieved the rank of captain and was brevetted a major for his performance during the Siege of Petersburg.

Burnett was a member of the Assembly during the 1877 session. Previously, he had been sheriff of Pierce County from January 1, 1872, until January 1, 1873. He was a Republican.

Personal life 
On November 24, 1873, Burnett married Amelia Frances Cox. He died in Santa Rosa, California, on April 14, 1895.

References

External links
The Civil War and Northwest Wisconsin

People from Madrid, New York
People from River Falls, Wisconsin
Republican Party members of the Wisconsin State Assembly
Wisconsin sheriffs
People of Wisconsin in the American Civil War
Union Army officers
Union Army soldiers
Farmers from Wisconsin
1895 deaths
Burials in California
1836 births